Florida's 2nd congressional district is a congressional district in the U.S. state of Florida. The district consists of the eastern part of the Florida Panhandle along with much of the Big Bend region along the Emerald Coast. It straddles both the Eastern and Central time zones. It is anchored in Tallahassee, the state capital, and includes Panama City. With 49% of its residents living in rural areas, it is the least urbanized district in the state, and voters are generally conservative. The district is represented by Republican Neal Dunn.

Characteristics
Florida's 2nd Congressional District is the largest congressional district in Florida by land area and consists of all of Bay, Calhoun, Franklin, Gulf, Jackson, Jefferson, Leon, Liberty, Taylor, Wakulla, Washington counties, portions of Holmes and Lafayette.

Most of the territory now in the 2nd was the 9th District from 1963 to 1983; it has been the 2nd since 1983. For most of its existence, the 2nd and its predecessors were centered in Tallahassee, the state capital and county seat of Leon County. While the adjacent 1st and 3rd congressional districts had become the most conservative districts in the state by the 1990s, the 2nd District was historically more of a swing district. With a large population of students, government workers and university faculty, Tallahassee was far more liberal than the rest of the district. Democrat Barack Obama received 62 percent of the Leon County vote in the 2008 presidential election, but Republican John McCain received 54 percent of the 2nd district's vote overall. The district had become somewhat friendlier to Republicans when conservative-leaning Panama City was shifted from the 1st District.

The district was significantly redrawn in a court-ordered redistricting that took effect for the 2016 election, following a lawsuit that challenged the district as gerrymandered, preventing African Americans from being able to elect representatives of their choice although they comprised a significant part of the population in the state. Under the new map, most of Tallahassee, along with nearly all of the 2nd's black residents, were drawn into the 5th District.

To make up for the loss in population, the 2nd was shifted slightly to the south to take in territory previously in the nearby 3rd and 11th districts. On paper, the new 2nd was more than 12 points more Republican than its predecessor. Mitt Romney had carried the old 2nd in 2012 although he received only 52 percent of the vote. By comparison, Romney would have carried the new 2nd with 64 percent of the vote in 2012, making it on paper the third-most Republican district in the state.

Voting

Voter registration

List of members representing the district

Election results

2002

2004

2006

2008

2010

2012

2014

2016

2018

2020

2022

Historical district boundaries

References

 
 
 Congressional Biographical Directory of the United States 1774–present

Notes

02